Brenton Spencer is a Canadian film and television director and cinematographer. His television credits include Earth: Final Conflict, Andromeda, 21 Jump Street, Mutant X, Poltergeist: The Legacy, Sanctuary, Stargate Atlantis and among other series. His film credits include Blown Away (1992) starring Corey Haim, Corey Feldman and Nicole Eggert, The Play (1994) starring J. H. Wyman and Kim Coates, Never Cry Werewolf (2008) starring Nina Dobrev and Paradox (2009) starring Kevin Sorbo, which was screened at the Cannes Independent Film Festival in 2010.

References

External links 
 
 

Canadian film directors
Canadian television directors
Living people
Place of birth missing (living people)
1953 births